Charles Wesley Dannals (1824–1893)  was an American politician. Born on 2 November 1824 in New York City as the youngest child of John Dannals and Hannah DeWitt, Dannals migrated west as a young man, as he was a member of the California State Assembly in 1854 and 1855, one of five members representing Yuba County. He married Darion D. Wood. For the year 1870-71 he was, as a member of the Sacramento lodge, Grandmaster of the Independent Order of Odd Fellows of California. Dannals died on September 31, 1893.

References

External links
Charles W. Dannals at The Political Graveyard

1824 births
1893 deaths
Members of the California State Assembly
People from Yuba County, California
Politicians from New York City
19th-century American politicians